Lóðurr (also Lodurr) is a god in Norse mythology. In the  poem  he is assigned a role in animating the first humans, but apart from that he is hardly ever mentioned, and remains obscure. Scholars have variously identified him with Loki, Vé, Vili and Freyr, but consensus has not been reached on any one theory.

Name and etymology 
The name's meaning is unknown.

The metrical position of Lóðurr's name in the skaldic poem , composed in the strict dróttkvætt metre, indicates that it contains the sound value /ó/ rather than /o/. This evidence, while strong, is not incontrovertible and some scholars have held out for a  reading.

Attestations

Völuspá 

The precise meaning of these strophes and their context in Völuspá is debated. The word  is obscure and the translations "film of flesh" and "blood" are just two of the many possibilities that have been suggested. The phrase "litu góða" is somewhat less difficult and traditionally interpreted as "good colours", "good shape" or even "good looks".

While the manuscripts do not distinguish between the phonemes /o/ and /ó/, most other scholars have preferred the /ó/ reading for metrical reasons. The metrical structure of 's fornyrðislag is, however, not very rigid and in 1983 Rydberg's theory was championed again by Gro Steinsland. It remains debated.

Other attestations 
The name is found in the skaldic poems  and  where "Lóðurr's friend" is used as a kenning for Odin.

In Snorri Sturluson's Prose Edda, Lóðurr is conspicuously absent. Here the creation of humans is attributed to the sons of Borr, whom Snorri names elsewhere as Odin, Vili and Vé.

Snorri often quotes  in his work, but in this case he does not. We cannot know whether he knew the strophes above or whether he was working entirely from other sources.

Nordendorf fibula 
Another source sometimes brought into the discussion is the Nordendorf fibula. This artifact, dating from about 600 CE, contains the runic inscription logaþorewodanwigiþonar. This is usually interpreted as Logaþore Wodan Wigiþonar, where Wodan is Odin and Wigiþonar probably is Thor. It would be natural for logaþore to be the name of a third god, but there is no obvious identification in Norse mythology as we know it. Both Lóðurr and Loki have been proposed, but the etymological reasoning is tenuous, and firm conclusions cannot be reached.

Theories 

Since the Prose Edda mentions the sons of Borr in the same context as Völuspá does Hœnir and Lóðurr, some scholars have reasoned that Lóðurr might be another name for either Vili or Vé. Viktor Rydberg was an early proponent of this theory, but recently it has received little attention.

A more popular theory proposed by the scholar Ursula Dronke is that Lóðurr is "a third name of Loki/Loptr". The main argument for this is that the gods Odin, Hœnir and Loki occur as a trio in Haustlöng, in the prose prologue to Reginsmál and also in the Loka Táttur a Faroese ballad which is a rare example of the occurrence of Norse gods in folklore. The Odin-kenning "Lóðurr's friend" furthermore appears to parallel the kenning "Loptr's friend" and Loki is similarly referred to as "Hœnir's friend" in Haustlöng, strengthening the trio connection. While many scholars agree with this identification, it is not universally accepted. Many scholars, including Jan de Vries and Georges Dumézil, have also identified Lóðurr as being the same deity as Loki.

Recently, Haukur Þorgeirsson of the University of Iceland suggested that Loki and Lóðurr were different names of the same deity based on that Loki is referred to as Lóður in the rimur . Haukur argues that whether the rimur is based on Snorri's  or a folksource the writer must have had the information about the identification from either a tradition or drawn the conclusion based on Eddic poems, since Snorri does not mention Lóðurr in his Edda. Since the contents of the Poetic Edda are assumed to have been forgotten around 1400 when the rimur was written Haukur argues for a traditional identification. Haukur also points to  where the same identification is made with Loki and Lóðurr. Haukur Þorgeirsson says that unless the possible but unlikely idea that the 14th and 15th century poets possessed lost written sources unknown to us, the idea must have come from either an unlikely amount of sources from where the poets could have drawn a similar conclusion that Loki and Lóðurr are identical like some recent scholars or that there still were remnants of an oral tradition. Haukur concludes that if Lóðurr was historically considered an independent deity from Loki, then a discussion of when and why he became identified with Loki is appropriate.

An identification with Freyr has also been proposed. This theory emphasizes the possible fertility-related meanings of Lóðurr's name but otherwise has little direct evidence to support it.

References

Citations

Bibliography
 Ásgeir Blöndal Magnússon (1989). Íslensk orðsifjabók. Reykjavík: Orðabók Háskólans.
 Brodeur, Arthur Gilchrist (transl.) (1916). The Prose Edda by Snorri Sturluson. New York: The American-Scandinavian Foundation. Available online at Google Books.
 Bugge, Sophus (1867). Norræn fornkvæði. Christiania: Malling. Available online at Sæmundar Edda. In particular Völuspá.
 Bæksted, Anders (1986). Goð og hetjur í heiðnum sið, Eysteinn Þorvaldsson translated to Icelandic. Reykjavík: Örn og Örlygur. Pages 74 and 184.
 Dronke, Ursula (1997). The Poetic Edda : Volume II : Mythological Poems. Oxford: Clarendon Press. In particular p. 18 and pp. 124–5.
 Eysteinn Björnsson (2001). Lexicon of Kennings : The Domain of Battle. KENNINGS
 Eysteinn Björnsson (ed.). Snorra-Edda: Formáli & Gylfaginning : Textar fjögurra meginhandrita. 2005. GYLFAGINNING
 Eysteinn Björnsson (ed.). .  This editor prefers the  reading.
 Finnur Jónsson (1913). Goðafræði Norðmanna og Íslendinga eftir heimildum. Reykjavík: Hið íslenska bókmentafjelag.
 Finnur Jónsson (1931). Lexicon Poeticum. København: S. L. Møllers Bogtrykkeri.
 Jón Helgason (1971). Eddadigte : Völuspá Hávamál, 2. ændrede udg. København: Munksgaard.
 Lindow, John (2001). Handbook of Norse mythology. Santa Barbara: ABC-Clio. .
 Rydberg, Viktor (1886-1889). . Stockholm: Bonnier.
 Simek, Rudolf. Dictionary of Northern Mythology. 1993. Trans. Angela Hall. Cambridge: D. S. Brewer. . New edition 2000, .
 Sigurður Nordal (1952). . Reykjavík: Helgafell.
 Steinsland, Gro (1983). "Antropogonimyten i Völuspá. Lund.
 Thorpe, Benjamin (tr.) (1866). Edda Sæmundar Hinns Froða : The Edda Of Sæmund The Learned. (2 vols.) London: Trübner & Co. Norroena Society edition (1905) available online at Google Books
 Turville-Petre, E. O. G. (1964). Myth and Religion of the North : The Religion of Ancient Scandinavia. London: Weidenfeld and Nicolson. In particular pages 143-4.

Æsir
Creator gods
Norse gods
Loki
Freyr